Sadhana Sargam is an Indian singer, whose voice has been extensively recorded for thousands of tracks in Indian cinema. In addition to being a renowned playback singer, she is also a trained Hindustani classical singer who has recorded hundreds of bhajans, ghazals, and other spiritual tracks. She, has to her credit, won a National Film Award, two Filmfare awards, five Maharashtra State Film awards, four Gujarat State Film Awards, and one Orissa State Film Award. She has recorded more than 15000 songs in 36 regional languages.

Multilingual playback singer Sadhana Sargam has recorded numerous private albums and songs. Below are her mainstream Hindi, Marathi, Tamil, Telugu, Kannada and Malayalam record lists. She has also released thousands of devotional Hindu albums including Gajanana, Aartiyan, Shri Sai Mantra, Shri Ram Mantra and Jai Ambe Maa to name a few. Her 2015 Sai bhajan "Sai Ram Sai Shyam" has found immense popularity among devotees.

Hindi films

1978

1982

1983

1984

1985

1986

1987

1988

1989

1990

1991

1992

1993

1994

1995

1996

1997

1998

1999

2000 - 2005

2006 - till date

Hindi Non-film songs

Hindi TV Serial songs

Tamil films

1996-2000

2001

2002

2003

2004

2005

2006

2007

2008

2009

2010 - till date

Kannada films

Telugu films

Malayalam films

Bengali film songs

Marathi Songs

Bhojpuri Songs

Gujarati Songs

Non-film Songs

Nepali

Odia Songs

Non-film songs

Rajasthani Songs

Punjabi Songs

Assamese Songs

Haryanvi film Songs

Chattishgarh Songs

Biyari Songs

Duets with Hariharan

Non-film Albums and Singles 

 Sadhana Sargam, along with 38 other Indian artists, recorded the National Anthem track commemorating the song's 100th anniversary in 2011.
 Garaj Garaj Aye Kale Badra, a duet with Sonali Bajpayee, from Cinema Cinema, 1979.
 Swar Vihar in 1988, music by Kalyanji-Anandji.
 Nasha Hi Nasha in Sahara, a duet with Kishore Kumar in 1989.
 Kabhi Aasoon Kabhi Khushboo Kabhi Nagma.
 Vaada.
 Oh My Love.
 Rrahaat.
 Pehli Nazar.
 Aaina.
 Aura of Positivity.
 Sakhe Wah, a solo classical track, in the music of Rahul Madhukar Ranade.
 Sarala Swaragala from a Kannada album - "Neralaagi".
 Itna Na Mujhse Tu Pyar Bada, a duet with Pascal Heni, in 2016.
 Sargam has recorded a song, Ye Kalam, to empower women's education and rights.

TV Serial Title Tracks 

 "Ya Sukhano Ya"
 "Vahinisaheb"
 "Saavitri"
 "Kwabhon Ki Dharmiyaan"
 "Dosh Na Kunacha"
 "Mi Marathi"
 "Mangalsutra"
 "Saibaba"
 "Basera"
 "Jhilmil Sitaaron Ka Aangan Hoga"
 "Kora Kagaz"
 "Iss Pyaar Ko Kya Naam Doon?"
 "Kiti Sangaychay mala"
 "Yeh Un Dinon Ki Baat Hai"
 Chellamay track in 3 languages
 Maharani in Telugu and Tamil.

Television

References

External links
 Sadhana Sargam biography
 Sadhana Sargam website

Lists of songs recorded by Indian singers